"You Are in My System" is a 1982 song recorded by American band the System. The song, written by Mic Murphy and David Frank, was released in August 1982 by Mirage Records. The song is also included on their debut studio album Sweat (1983). The song is one of the duo’s most recognizable songs, and a favorite of many System fans worldwide.

Reception
"You Are in My System" reached No. 64 on the Billboard Hot 100, while it topped both the Black Singles and Club Play charts. A Spanish version of the song called "Tu Estas En Mi Systema" was released by the System in late-1982.

Robert Palmer version

In 1983, the song was covered by the English rock singer Robert Palmer. This version, which was produced by Palmer and remixed by Dominique Blanc-Francard, reached No. 78 on the Billboard Hot 100 chart and also reached No. 33 on the Mainstream Rock chart. It was actually recorded after the rest of the Pride album had been completed when Palmer heard the original 12" promo copy at famous Paris private night club l'Elysées Matignon played by top DJ Bernie Bernthaler. He quickly flew back to cut it as an extra track, and it was recorded within 24 hours. He had even persuaded David Frank to play on it himself. This was the album's only successful single.

Track listing

The System
12" vinyl
 US: Mirage / DMD-384
a 1983 release

12" vinyl
 UK: Polydor / POSPX 580

Robert Palmer
12" vinyl
 UK: Island / IS-104 
 a 1983 release

Personnel

The System 
 Producer: Mic Murphy, David Frank
 Songwriter: Mic Murphy, David Frank
 Produced by Mic Murphy and David Frank for Science Lab Productions.

Robert Palmer 
 Executive Producer: David Harper
 Arrangement: Robert Palmer
 Producer: Robert Palmer
 Photography: Peter Ashworth
 Mixing: Dominique Blanc-Francard
 Music: RP Band

Chart performance

The System version

Robert Palmer version

References

External links
 

1983 singles
The System (band) songs
Robert Palmer (singer) songs
Songs written by David Frank (musician)
1982 songs
Island Records singles
Mirage Records singles
Songs written by Mic Murphy